Devil In Disguise can refer to:
"(You're the) Devil in Disguise", a 1963 single by Elvis Presley
"Christine's Tune", a song from the 1969 album The Gilded Palace of Sin by the Flying Burrito Brothers
a cover version (by that name) of "Christine's Tune", from the 1982 live album Last Date by Emmylou Harris
a song from the 1982 album Grasshopper by J. J. Cale
the 2009 novel by Julian Clary

See also
Angel in Disguise (disambiguation)